Mangwe District is a district of the Province Matabeleland South in Zimbabwe. It is divided into 17 wards. Some of the wards are Ngwizi, Mphoengs, Sanzukwi, Sangulube, Maninji, Madabe, Mbakwe, Empandeni, Mayobodo, Mambale, Makorokoro, Tshitshi, and Marula. Some villages found in this district are Bulu, Kweneng, Togotsweu. Mangwe used to be a part of bigger district which was known as Bulilimamangwe. Bulilimamangwe was then divided into 3 districts now known as Mangwe, Bulilima and Plumtree.

Demographics 
According to the Zimbabwe Census of 2022, Mangwe District has a total population of 65,562 people. The population  distribution amongst the 17 wards found in Mangwe District is shown below:

Education 
In Mangwe District there are about 45  primary schools and 15 secondary schools. The top 10 Primary schools found in the district listed according to their 2020 Grade 7 Performance are:

Health 
Mangwe has 13 health facilities: three hospitals and ten clinics. Of the 13 health facilities, four are mission owned whilst the rest belong to the government.

Business Centres 
There are 15 business centres in Mangwe,

References

Districts of Matabeleland South Province